Matt Sutton (born 13 July 1984) is an Australian basketball player for the Mount Gambier Pioneers of the South East Australian Basketball League (SEABL).

Between 2002 and 2009, Sutton played in the Central ABL for the Forestville Eagles. In 2006, he joined the Adelaide 36ers for the 2006–07 NBL season. He continued on with the 36ers in 2007–08, and in 50 games over two seasons, he averaged 3.3 points, 1.4 rebounds and 1.1 assists per game.

In 2010, Sutton joined the Mount Gambier Pioneers of the South East Australian Basketball League. In 2012, he became captain of the Pioneers and guided them to three straight conference titles between 2013 and 2015, and back-to-back championships in 2014 and 2015. In 168 games for the Pioneers, he has averaged 7.3 points, 3.3 rebounds and 2.4 assists per game.

References

External links
Australiabasket.com profile
NBL profile
Pioneers player profile

1984 births
Living people
Adelaide 36ers players
Australian men's basketball players
Point guards
Basketball players from Adelaide